Gao County or Gaoxian is a county of Sichuan Province, China. It is under the administration of Yibin city and has a population of 526,400 in 2019, 171,000 of which live in the urban area. The county seat is located 48 km from Yibin city. The county is traversed by the Nanguang River (:zh:南广河), a tributary of the Yangtze. About half of the land area is covered by forests.

On 20 March 1994, 18 people were killed by a landslide in the east of Gao County.

Administrative divisions 
Gao County administers 13 towns:

 Qingfu 
 Wenjiang 
 Yuejiang 
 Shahe 
 Jiaocun 
 Luochang 
 Shengtian 
 Laifu 
 Kejiu
 Jiale
 Xiaxing
 Luorun
 Qingling

Climate

References

Counties and districts of Yibin